This is a complete alphabetical list of constituency election results to the 33rd Parliament of the United Kingdom at the 1923 general election, held on 5 December 1923.

Notes 
 Change in % vote and swing is calculated between the winner and second place and their respective performances at the 1922 election. A plus denotes a swing to the winner and a minus against the winner.

England 

The results in England are in a separate article for size reasons.

Scotland 

|}

|}

|}

|}

|}

|}

|}

|}

|}

|}

|}

|}

|}

|}

|}

|}

|}

|}

|}

|}

|}

|}

|}

|}

|}

|}

|}

|}

|}

|}

|}

|}

|}

|}

|}

|}

Wales 

|}

|}

|}

|}

|}

|}

|}

|}

|}

|}

|}

|}

|}

|}

|}

|}

|}

|}

|}

|}

|}

|}

|}

|}

|}

|}

|}

|}

|}

|}

|}

|}

|}

|}

|}

Northern Ireland 

|}

|}

|}

|}

|}

|}

|}

|}

|}

Universities 

|}

|}

|}

References 

1923
1923 United Kingdom general election